Alfred Nu Steele (April 24, 1900 – April 19, 1959) was an American soft drink businessman most known for being the CEO of Pepsi-Cola Company from 1949 until his death in 1959.

Life and career
Alfred Steele graduated from Northwestern University in 1923, where he played football, and became an ad executive. He first worked for The Coca-Cola Company, as vice president of marketing.

He became the CEO of the Pepsi-Cola Company in 1949. Under his management, sales tripled between 1955 and 1957. He reduced the sugar content of Pepsi products and introduced them to developing countries. Under Steele's leadership, Pepsi built a new headquarters at 500 Park Avenue in New York City. He worked for Pepsi until his death from a heart attack in April 1959, five days shy of his 59th birthday.

He was the fourth and last husband of actress Joan Crawford (married May 10, 1955, in Las Vegas). Herbert L. Barnet, Steele's handpicked successor as chairman and CEO, appointed her to the board of directors. In Joan Crawford's later career, product placement for Pepsi was included in several films, including Strait-Jacket (1964) and Berserk! (1967). Crawford would remain on the board of directors of the Pepsi-Cola Company until 1973. The two had their ashes interred in a crypt together upon Crawford's death in 1977. They are interred in Ferncliff Cemetery in Hartsdale, New York. His crypt marker incorrectly lists his middle initial as "M" for no explained reason.

Steele was portrayed by Harry Goz in the 1981 film Mommie Dearest.

References

1900 births
1959 deaths
20th-century American businesspeople
American chief executives of food industry companies
Burials at Ferncliff Cemetery
Northwestern University alumni
People from the Nashville metropolitan area
PepsiCo people